Afshariyeh Rural District is a rural district (dehestan) in Khorramdasht District, Takestan County, Qazvin Province, Iran. At the 2006 census, its population was 8,549, in 2,173 families.  The rural district has 5 villages.

References 

Rural Districts of Qazvin Province
Takestan County